Koprivnički Bregi is a municipality in the Koprivnica-Križevci County in Croatia. According to the 2011 census, there are 2,381 inhabitants in the area, with Croats forming an absolute majority.

References

Municipalities of Croatia
Populated places in Koprivnica-Križevci County